Bruce Harry Bennett  (23 March 1941, Perth – 14 April 2012) was an Australian specialist in Australian literary studies. A Rhodes Scholar, his professional career was spent largely at the University of Western Australia where he was also director of the Centre for Studies in Australian Literature.

Awards and recognition 
Bennett's biography of Peter Porter won the Western Australian Premier's Book Award for non-fiction. 

He was elected a Fellow of the Australian Academy of the Humanities in 1995 and was made an Officer of the Order of Australia in 1993 for "service to education and to Australian literature". He was awarded a Centenary Medal in 2001.

Selected works 
 Bruce, Bennett, ed. (1981). Cross Currents: Magazines and Newspapers in Australian Literature, Melbourne: Longman Cheshire.

References

1941 births
2012 deaths
People from Perth, Western Australia
Australian Rhodes Scholars
Recipients of the Centenary Medal
Officers of the Order of Australia
Fellows of the Australian Academy of the Humanities
Academic staff of the University of Western Australia